Elachista lerauti is a moth of the family Elachistidae. It is found in France.

References

lerauti
Moths described in 1992
Moths of Europe